Penn & Teller: Fool Us is a  magic competition television series in which magicians perform tricks in front of American magician-comedian duo Penn & Teller. Its first two seasons were hosted by Jonathan Ross, and the third season onwards by Alyson Hannigan. Fool Us was filmed at Fountain Studios in London, England (season one) and the Penn & Teller Theater in Las Vegas (season two onward). After each performance, if Penn & Teller cannot figure out how a trick was done, the magician(s) who performed it win a Fool Us trophy (since season 2) and a five-star trip to Las Vegas to perform as the opening act in Penn & Teller's show, also at the Rio Hotel & Casino.

The ninth season premiered on 14 October 2022.

Format
Each episode starts off with the introduction stating the purpose of the series. Penn & Teller come out and take their seats towards center stage, and hopeful magicians perform (6 in the pilot, 4 in season 1–present) their acts in front of them with a live studio audience.

After each performance, Penn & Teller privately confer while the host interviews the magicians. Penn then reveals if they know how the trick was performed, typically using cryptic language, or they write down the method and present it privately to the magicians to confirm, so as to avoid publicly exposing the secrets behind the trick.  Teller notes that the doublespeak helps teach people new techniques without spoiling the trick.

If Penn & Teller are wrong, or cannot come up with how the trick was done, the magician wins a Fool Us trophy and the opportunity to later perform at one of Penn & Teller's Las Vegas shows. A backstage judge or judges, versed in the techniques of the magic industry and privately informed how the trick is done prior to the show, makes any necessary calls whether Penn & Teller were properly fooled. At the end of each episode, Penn & Teller perform a magic act of their own.

Production
The pilot of Fool Us was first commissioned by John Kaye Cooper, the controller of entertainment for ITV. In February 2011, it was announced that due to good viewing figures, a series of eight episodes had been commissioned, and would be produced by September Films and 1/17 Productions. The eight episodes were shot in a ten-day filming block, and began airing in June 2011.

It was announced on 28 June 2012 that ITV had cancelled the show, despite averaging 4 million viewers, higher than the norm for the timeslot. After finding moderate ratings success in running the ITV-produced episodes during the summer of 2014, The CW ordered a second season of original episodes to air in 2015. The second season was a ratings hit for The CW, giving the network its highest ratings in that time slot compared to the previous five years.

On 11 August 2015 the series was renewed for a third season by The CW which premiered on 13 July 2016, now hosted by Alyson Hannigan. The fourth season premiered on 13 July 2017.  A special one-off April Fool's episode was broadcast on 2 April 2018 as a precursor to the fifth season, which premiered on 25 June 2018. After another April Fool's episode on 1 April 2019, the sixth season premiered on 17 June 2019.

In the summer of 2020 the show was renewed for a seventh season, which was set to begin filming in October 2020. Due to COVID-19 safety and travel restrictions, the second half of season 7 was filmed with a virtual audience, and international acts performed via video from their home countries. The magicians and crew were tested for COVID over 660 times, with every result negative. On 20 January 2022, the series was renewed for a ninth season.

Episodes

Performers who fooled Penn & Teller are listed in bold type.

Season 1 (2011)

Unaired segments include:

 Chris Cox, mind reader (unaired as he was the only performer who failed in his performance)
 James Brown, stage magician
 Marc Oberon, card magician
 David Masters, illusionist
 Noel Qualter, close-up magician
 David Jay, illusionist

Season 2 (2015)
{{Episode table |background=#EBE305 |overall=5 |season=5 |title=45 |airdate=25 |prodcode=10 |viewers=10 |country=U.S. |episodes=

{{Episode list
| EpisodeNumber   = 15
| EpisodeNumber2  = 6
| Title           = Now THAT'S Bunny!
| OriginalAirDate = 
| ProdCode        = 206
| Viewers         = 2.35
| ShortSummary    =

 Jay Sankey, close-up magician
 Greg Wilson, illusionist' Trigg Watson, close-up magician
 Jen Kramer, close-up magician
 Penn and Teller pull a rabbit out of a hat

| LineColor       = EBE305
}}

}}

Season 3 (2016)

Season 4 (2017)

Season 5 (2018)

Season 6 (2019)

Season 7 (2020–21)

Season 8 (2021–22)

Season 9 (2022–23)

Reception
Critical reception
Readers of UKGameshows.com named it the second best new game show of 2011 in their "Hall of fame" poll.

In a November 26, 2019 essay, The New York Times Magazine gave Fool Us its "Letter of Recommendation," calling the show "an island of civility and generosity in our cruel, contentious and otherwise debased times."

U.S. ratings
 Season 1 

 Season 2 

 Season 3 

 Season 4 

 Season 5 

 Season 6 

 Season 7 

 Season 8 

 Season 9 

Broadcast
In Australia, the show commenced airing on ABC1 each Saturday at 9:25 pm from 1 October 2011. In New Zealand, the show commenced airing on ChoiceTV each Saturday at 7:30 pm from 28 April 2012. The CW acquired the series for broadcast in the United States, where it premiered on 30 July 2014. The pilot episode was trimmed to one hour (including commercial breaks) for its CW airing. In Canada, the series aired on Bite TV before it was rebranded to Makeful on 24 August 2015. Channel 5 bought the UK rights to the second season and premiered it on 6 March 2016.

Other versions
 In 2011 it was reported that the format had been sold to Ukraine broadcaster STB, who would produce a local version.
 In 2012 the show was licensed to Israel's Channel 2. The show was renamed Mi Yapil Et Ha Master'' ("Who Can Fool The Master?"). Penn & Teller were asked to be the judging magicians but they had to decline due to other commitments. Max Maven took their place, and the winner of the show was mentalist Eran Biderman.

References

External links

 
 

2011 American television series debuts
2011 British television series debuts
American television magic shows
British television magic series
English-language television shows
ITV (TV network) original programming
The CW original programming
2010s American reality television series
2010s British reality television series
2020s American reality television series
2020s British reality television series